Ionuț Movileanu (born 10 September 1991), is a Romanian futsal player who plays for Dunărea Călărași and the Romanian national futsal team.

References

External links
UEFA profile

1991 births
Living people
Romanian men's futsal players